Paul Grant (26 June 1943 – 23 November 2003) was a Welsh body builder who won the "amateur tall" category of the Mr. Universe contest in 1973 and went on to become an ambassador for the sport. Grant also won titles including Mr. Wales, Mr. Britain, Mr. Europe and Mr. World, and placed 2nd in the World Championships two times.  Grant was 5 ft 11 and at his peak weighed 16 stones (224 pounds) with a 50-inch chest and 33-inch waist.

Early life
Grant was born in Swansea on 26 June 1943 (he was a twin). He started lifting weights at the age of 16. He spent his childhood years running cross-country, and at age 16 dropped out of school to start his own business - a bread delivery service. In the evenings, he spent time working out and bulking up. He married Christine (née Mason) in 1967 who went on to become Miss Universe Bikini.

Bodybuilding career
Grant moved near Venice Beach, California in the early 1970s where he trained at Gold's Gym with Arnold Schwarzenegger.  Schwarzenegger became Grant's friend and they appeared in the 1976 documentary Pumping Iron together.  While in California Grant worked for Joe Weider.

Paul competed in the NABBA Universe competition in 1971, placing 2nd in the tall class 1. He was particularly known for his overall muscularity and superb delts, fantastically cut abs and great thigh sweep.

Accomplishments

Diet

For breakfast he would eat four unsweetened Weetabix moistened with a little milk and washed down by a drink of egg powder concentrate mixed with water. During the day he would eat steak, chicken and peas, with a little non-fat ice cream and four more egg powder drinks. He consumed over 9,000 powdered eggs a year.

Retirement
Grant moved back to Swansea where he ran a health food store and then a gym.  He was president of the Welsh Federation of Body-Builders for 25 years from 1978, in charge of staging the Mr. Wales and Mr. Britain competitions.

Controversies

View on Steroids
Paul had said the he did not take steroids but only because he could put on weight without them. However controversially, he did not disapprove. "All them kids in Biafra are on steroids," he said in an interview in 1973. "Builds them up. Fills them out. Does them good, and that's a fact.”

Health issues and death
Grant developed a kidney disease in his 30s. Because of this, his eyesight was poor and he had to spend three days per week, eight hours a day attached to a dialysis machine. This led to a transplant operation in 1985.  

He died at the age of 60 on 23 November 2003.

References

External links
 Getty Images photos of Paul Grant:  

Welsh bodybuilders
Welsh twins
2003 deaths
1943 births